The 190 Squadron of the Israeli Air Force, also known as the tayeset maga hakesem (Magic Touch Squadron), is an AH-64A Apache helicopter squadron  based at Ramon Airbase.

The squadron was formed in 1980 in Palmachim Airbase, firstly flying the McDonnell Douglas MD 500 Defender. Only in the year 1995, the squadron got the newly bought AH-64A and moved to Ramon Airbase. 

The squadron took part in the 1982 Lebanon-Israel war and the 2006 Lebanon-Israel war, mostly making precise strikes and supporting ground forces.

References

Israeli Air Force squadrons